WEVE-FM is a radio station on 97.9 FM in Eveleth, Minnesota.  The station is programmed with an adult contemporary format targeted towards the 25-54 age group.  Established in 1978, WEVE-FM is owned by Midwest Communications. Although the station broadcasts satellite-syndicated programming, it also features local on-air personalities and a full news staff.

On August 24, 2016, Midwest Communications announced that it was purchasing WEVE-FM from Red Rock Radio in a deal that included sister stations KQDS-FM in Duluth, WXXZ in Grand Marais, KAOD in Babbitt, and KGPZ in Coleraine, as well as translators W221AU, W252AN, and W288AI; the sale was completed on December 31, 2016, at a purchase price of $5.625 million.

Translators
WEVE's primary station coverage is augmented by two translators:

Former logo

References

External links

Minnesota Radio Stations (Northpine)

Mainstream adult contemporary radio stations in the United States
Radio stations in Minnesota
Midwest Communications radio stations
Radio stations established in 1978
1978 establishments in Minnesota